Gilbert de Gant (Giselbert de Gand, Ghent, Gaunt) (c. 1040 – 1095) was the son of Ralph, Lord of Aalst near Ghent, and Gisele of Luxembourg, the sister-in-law of Baldwin IV, Count of Flanders. Gilbert de Gant was a kinsman of Matilda of Flanders, wife of William the Conqueror. He had two older brothers, Baldwin and Ralph. Gilbert of Ghent is mentioned in the Domesday Book of 1086 as having been given titles of 172 English manors (most in Lincolnshire and Nottinghamshire) but also within 14 shires where there were estates including York, Derby, Huntingdonshire, Leicestershire and Cambridgeshire.

Gilbert de Gant was a commander with William Malet when the city of York was put to the torch on 19 September 1069.  Gilbert died about 1095 being buried at Bardney Abbey near Lincoln City.

Marriage and issue
He married Alice, Dame de Montfort-sur-Risle in about 1071 and they are known to have had the following issue:
Walter de Gant, married Maud de Penthièvre, had issue.
Gilbert de Gant, died without issue.
Hugh de Montfort, seigneur de Montfort-sur-Risle, married Adeline de Meulan, had issue.
Robert de Gant, Dean of York, Lord Chancellor.
Ralph de Gant
Henry de Gant
Emma de Gant, married Alan de Percy, had issue.
Agnes de Gant, married William FitzNigel, had issue.

Notes

References 

11th-century English nobility
1040 births
1095 deaths
Year of birth uncertain